Édes méreg is the second album by the Hungarian singer and Megasztár runner-up, Ibolya Oláh. The album was released on November 12, 2005.

The album has gone platinum in Hungary as it has sold 20,000 copies.

Track listing
"Magyarország" (Dragone/Tardos/Amesse/Dupere–Péter Geszti; cover of "Alegría" by Cirque du Soleil)
"Édes méreg" (Norbert Szűcs–Tamás Orbán)
"Még él még" (Ibolya Oláh-Péter Novák)
"A hiba" (Novák)
"Marionett" (Szűcs–Orbán)
"Belső bolygó" (Oláh–Orbán)
"Papírkutya" (Novák)
"Nézz vissza" (Oláh–Szűcs)
"Eddig, baby" (Oláh–Csajtay)
"Ibolyavirág" (Gábor Presser)
"Öröm és könny" (Presser–Dusán Sztevanovity)
"Valamit valamiért" (Roy–Novák)

References

2005 albums